The Trairi River is a river of Rio Grande do Norte state in northeastern Brazil.

The river basin contains the Nísia Floresta National Forest, a  sustainable use conservation unit created in 2001.

See also
List of rivers of Rio Grande do Norte

References

Brazilian Ministry of Transport

Rivers of Rio Grande do Norte